Gil Nam-su (born 6 October 1972) is a North Korean weightlifter. He competed in the men's flyweight event at the 1992 Summer Olympics.

References

External links
 

1972 births
Living people
North Korean male weightlifters
Olympic weightlifters of North Korea
Weightlifters at the 1992 Summer Olympics
Place of birth missing (living people)
20th-century North Korean people